The Krank Manufacturing Company building in Saint Paul, Minnesota, United States, is a 1926 industrial building featuring glazed terracotta panels with brightly carved floral and classical motifs. It is listed on the National Register of Historic Places. The company made cosmetics, creams and shampoos.

Gallery

References

Industrial buildings completed in 1926
Buildings designated early commercial in the National Register of Historic Places
National Register of Historic Places in Saint Paul, Minnesota
Industrial buildings and structures on the National Register of Historic Places in Minnesota
History of cosmetics